In mathematics, specifically ring theory, a principal ideal is an ideal  in a ring  that is generated by a single element  of  through multiplication by every element of  The term also has another, similar meaning in order theory, where it refers to an (order) ideal in a poset  generated by a single element  which is to say the set of all elements less than or equal to  in 

The remainder of this article addresses the ring-theoretic concept.

Definitions

While this definition for two-sided principal ideal may seem more complicated than the others, it is necessary to ensure that the ideal remains closed under addition.

If  is a commutative ring with identity, then the above three notions are all the same.

Examples of non-principal ideal
Not all ideals are principal.
But zero is the only constant in  so we have a contradiction.

In the ring  the numbers where  is even form a non-principal ideal. This ideal forms a regular hexagonal lattice in the complex plane.

Related definitions
A ring in which every ideal is principal is called principal, or a principal ideal ring. A principal ideal domain (PID) is an integral domain in which every ideal is principal. Any PID is a unique factorization domain; the normal proof of unique factorization in the integers (the so-called fundamental theorem of arithmetic) holds in any PID.

Examples of principal ideal
Suppose  where  and consider the surjective homomorphisms  Since  is finite, for sufficiently large  we have  Thus  which implies  is always finitely generated.

However, all rings have principal ideals, namely, any ideal generated by exactly one element.

Properties

Any Euclidean domain is a PID; the algorithm used to calculate greatest common divisors may be used to find a generator of any ideal.
More generally, any two principal ideals in a commutative ring have a greatest common divisor in the sense of ideal multiplication.
In principal ideal domains, this allows us to calculate greatest common divisors of elements of the ring, up to multiplication by a unit; we define  to be any generator of the ideal 

This question arose in connection with the study of rings of algebraic integers (which are examples of Dedekind domains) in number theory, and led to the development of class field theory by Teiji Takagi, Emil Artin, David Hilbert, and many others.

See also 
Ascending chain condition for principal ideals

References
 

Ideals (ring theory)
Commutative algebra